Colla Voche is an album by cellist Ernst Reijseger with the vocal group Tenore e Cuncordu de Orosei, recorded in 1998 in Sardinia and released on the Winter & Winter label.

Reception

In her review for Allmusic, Joslyn Layne said "The music flows back and forth between new and traditional material, but there is a consistent sound and calm atmosphere throughout... Although the musicians' respective solo albums are the best showcase of their talent, this is a lovely and worthwhile album".

Track listing
All compositions by Ernst Reijseger except as indicated
 "Libera Me, Domine" (Traditional) - 6:19
 "Nanneddu Meu" (Peppino Mereu, Tonino Puddu) - 6:34
 "Strabismo di Venere" - 6:53
 "Armonica" (Traditional) - 4:38
 "A Una Rosa (Voche 'e Notte Antica)" (Traditional) - 10:18
 "Trumba" - 4:46
 "Colla Voche" - 5:08
 "Su Puddhu (Balla Turturinu)" (Traditional) - 5:34
 "Su Bolu 'e S'Astore" (Tonino Puddu) - 3:30
 "Dillu" (Traditional) - 3:59

Personnel
Ernst Reijseger - cello, vocals
Patrizio Mura - vocals (voche), harmonica, Jew's harp
Massimo Roych, Piero Pala - vocals (voche, mesuvoche)  
Gianluca Frau, Martino Corimbi - vocals (cronta)
Mario Siotto, Salvatore Dessena - vocals (bassu)
Alan "Gunga" Purves - percussion

References

Winter & Winter Records albums
Ernst Reijseger albums
1999 albums